The Aragonese Way is a route of the Way of St. James beginning at the French-Spanish border at the pass of Somport and joining the French Way (or Camino Francés) at Puente la Reina-Gares in Navarre. It is the continuation of the Arles Way which begins in Arles and crosses the Pyrenees into Spain at Somport.

For the most part it follows the River Aragon.

Locations found along the Aragonese Way
Somport
Canfranc
Villanúa
Jaca
Santa Cruz de la Serós
Santa Cilia de Jaca
Puente la Reina de Jaca
Ruesta
Undués de Lerda
Sangüesa/Zangoza
Monreal/Elo
Eunate
Puente la Reina-Gares

References

Hiking trails in Spain
Aragon
Camino de Santiago routes
Bien de Interés Cultural landmarks in the Province of Zaragoza